The single station Estacion Bosa is part of the massive transport system Bogotá, TransMilenio, opened in the year 2000.

Location 
The station is located in Autopista Sur between the streets 63 south and 65 C south in Bosa to the south of the city. It attends the demand of the districts Bosa the Azucena and the Station, as well as the Perdomo and Casabianca of Ciudad Bolívar.

In the vicinity are the Terminal of Transport of the South and the Industrial Zone of Cazucá.

Etymology 
The station receives its name from the neighborhood Bosa The Station in which it will be located, right on the border with the municipality of Soacha.

History 
The station was designed to be built in the year 2013 to meet the demand of the locality of Bosa with an approximation of 8,000 passengers per day. The works are in charge of the Bosa Station Consortium 2013 and the interventory of the Consortium Interventores IDU The IDU starts construction of a new TransMilenio station in Bosa, The November 19, 2015 the Instituto de Desarrollo Urbano Urban Development Institute announced the completion of the construction of the station.

Service Station

Main Services

References 

TransMilenio